Sumithra (born 18 September 1953) is an Indian actress. She has appeared in Tamil, Malayalam, Kannada and Telugu language films. She acted as the lead heroine in films between 1974 and 1986. She later started being known for her roles as a mother since the 1990s.

Early life
Sumithra was born on 18 September 1953 to Raghavan Nair and Janaki at Thrissur, Kerala. She has three brothers, her father was working in an oil refining company. When she was doing her schooling, she learnt dance from Murugappan Master, who was the guide to actress K. R. Vijaya at that time. Sumithra is a good classical dancer.

Sumithra started her career at 19 years of age in the film Nrithasala (1972); director A. B. Raj is the first to have noticed Sumithra's talent.

Sumithra acted as heroine with Rajani and Kamal as well as she acted as mother to both of them.

Sumithra made her debut in Nirmalayam. She has acted in over 200 films in Tamil, Malayalam,  Kannada and Telugu languages. In Tamil, Avalum Penn Thaane (1974) was her first movie. Later in 1975, she made her debut Kannada movie Mugiyada Kathe, which had the popular song "Kangalu Vandane Helide". She has acted with leading heroes such as Vishnuvardhan, Rajesh in Kannada, Sivaji Ganesan, Jaishankar, Sivakumar, Rajnikanth and Kamal Haasan in Tamil. She's performed supporting roles in hundreds of Kannada, Tamil, Malayalam and Telugu movies.

Personal life
She was married to notable Kannada film director D. Rajendra Babu in 1980 and has two daughters Umashankari (born in 1982) and Nakshatra (born in 1990)

Her elder daughter Umashankari made her entry into movies through the Kannada movie Uppi Dada M.B.B.S. andChikkamma in the lead role, which is telecast on Udaya TV. Her second daughter Nakshatra debuted as lead actress in Tamil movie Doo

Filmography

Tamil
This list is incomplete; you can help by expanding it.

 Avalum Penn Thaane (1974) 
 Oru Kudumbathin Kadhai (1975)
 Lalitha (1976)
 Mogam Muppadhu Varusham (1976)
 Bhuvana Oru Kelvi Kuri (1977)
 Ragupathi Raagava Rajaram (1977)
 Nandha En Nila (1977)
 Annan Oru Koyil (1977)
 Chittu Kuruvi (1977)
 Nee Vazhva Vendum (1977)
 Nizhal Nijamagiradhu (1978)
 Ival Oru Seethai (1978)
 Iraivan Kodutha Varam (1978)
 Kannamoochi (1978)
 Machanai Paartheengala (1978)
 Paavathin Sambalam (1978)
 Vattathukkul Chaduram (1978)
 Sonnadhu Nee Thanaa (1978)
 Justice Gopinath (1978)
 Rudhra Thaandavam (1978)
 Kannan Oru Kai Kuzhanthai (1978)
 Muthal Iravu (1979)
 Kadavul Amaitha Medai (1979)
 Mugathil Mugam Paarkalaam (1979)
 Aadu Pambe (1979)
 Thevaigal (1979)
 Anbe Sangeetha (1979)
 Nee Sirithal Naan Sirippen (1979)
 Chellakili (1979)
 Mazhalai Pattalam (1980)
 Ore Mutham (1980)
 Ponnukku Yaar Kaaval (1980)
 Paakku Vethalai (1981)
 Tiruppangal (1981)
 Pattam Padhavi (1981)
 Deiva Thirumanangal-Srinivasa Kalyanam (1981)
 Vasanthakalam (1981)
 Nellikanni (1981)
 Engamma Maharani (1981)
 Sangili (1982)
 Anney Anney (1983)
 Aval Oru Kaaviyam (1983)
 Kuyile Kuyile (1984)
 Then Koodu (1984)
 Antha Uravukku Satchi (1984)
 Veli (1985)
 Kanni Rasi (1985)
 Mayavi (1985)
 Pournami Alaigal (1985)
 Yemaatrathe Yemaaraathe (1985)
 Oru Manithan Oru Manaivi (1986)
 Mahasakthi Mariamman (1986)
 Velicham (1987)
 Veerapandiyan (1987)
 Michael Raj (1987)
 Thaye Neeye Thunai (1987)
 Poove Ilam Poove (1987)
 Agni Natchathiram (1988)
 Maappillai Sir (1988)
 Panakkaran (1989)
 Sattathin Thirappu Vizhaa (1989)
 Meenakshi Thiruvilayadal (1989)
 Velai Kidaichuduchu (1990)
 Naan Pudicha Mappillai (1991)
 Nattai Thirudathey (1991)
 Chinna Thambi (1991)
 MGR Nagaril (1991)
 Pillai Paasam (1991)
 Karpoora Mullai (1991)
 Singaravelan (1992)
 Pandithurai (1992)
 Sathyam Adhu Nitchayam (1992)
 Idhu Namma Bhoomi (1992)
 Kattalai (1993)
 Enga Muthalali (1993)
 Maravan (1993)
 Airport (1993)
 Pagaivan (1997)
 Arasiyal (1997)
 Unnudan (1998)
 Kallazhagar (1999)
 Jodi (1999)
 Vadagupatti Maapillai (2001)
 Saamy (2003)
 Dharmapuri (2006)
 Thullal (2007)
 Veerappu  (2007)
 Indiralohathil Na Azhagappan (2008)
 Singam (2010)
 Singam 2 (2013)
 Chandra (2013)
 Veeram (2014)
 Muthina Kathirika (2016)
 Ilamai Oonjal (2016)
 Singam 3 (2017)
 Saamy 2 (2018)
 Raajavamsam (2021)
 Valimai (2022)

Malayalam

 Postmane Kananilla (1972) as Amrutham
 Nirthasala (1972) as Sharada
 Theerthayathra (1972) as Nangyarukutty
 Thenaruvi (1973) as Ichira
 Nirmalyam (1973) as Ammini
 Nellu (1974) as Sephiya
 Honeymoon (1974)
 Chandrakantham (1974)
 Thumbolarcha (1974) as Thamara
 Nagaram Sagaram (1974)
 Durga (1974)
 Udayam Kizhakku Thanne (1974)
 Chakravakam  (1974) as Padmini
 Madura Pathinezhu (1975)
 Neela Ponman (1975) as Veluthamma
 Manishada (1975)
 Swimming Pool (1976)
 Vazhi Vilakku (1976)
 Aruthu (1976)
 Appoppan (1976) as Amminikutty
 Neela Sari (1976)
 Sakhakkale Munnoottu (1977)
 Chakravarthini (1977)
 Niraparayum Nilavilakkum (1977)
 Abhinivesham (1977) as Sindhu
 Varadakshina (1977)
 Njaan Njaan Maathram (1978)
 Jalatharangam (1978)
 Adikkadi (1978)
 Lava (1980) as Sindhu
 Ivan Oru Simham (1982)
 Piriyilla Naam (1984) as Sumathi
 Muthodu Muthu (1984) as Malathi
 Ivide Ingane (1984) as Elsi
 Amme Narayana (1984) as Vedante Bhaarya
 Swantham Sarika (1984) as Bharati
 Kadamattathachan (1984) as Marykutti
 Thacholi Thankappan (1984) as Sujatha
 Ningalil Oru Sthree (1984)
 Aarorumariyathe (1984) as Thulasi
 Aalkkoottathil Thaniye (1984) as Seethalakshmi
 Lakshamanarekha (1984) as Vilasini Menon
 Parayanumvayya Parayathirikkanumvayya (1985) as Sathi
 Azhiyatha Bandhangal (1985) at Sulochana
 Eeran Sandhya (1985)
 Akkachide Kunjuvava (1985)
 Snehicha Kuttathinu (1985)
 Ee Thanalil Ithiri Nerum (1985)
 Sannaham (1985)
 Achuvettante Veedu (1987) as Beena
 Onnam Maanm Poomaanam (1987) as Sasi's wife
 Ulsavapittennu (1989) as Ettathi
 Ente Sooryaputhrikku (1991) as Dr. Srinivas's mother
 Daivathinte Makan (2000) as Janaki 
 Saphalam (2003) as Subhadra
 Calcutta News (2008)
 Bharya Onnu Makkal Moonnu (2009) as Saraswathiamma
 Vaidooryam (2012) as Sujatha 
 Monayi Angane Aanayi (2014) as Maya's mother
 Village Guys (2015)

Kannada

 Mugiyada Kathe (1976)
 Makkala Sainya (1980)
 Rajeshwari (1981)
 Asambhava (1985)
 Karna (1986)
 Ravi Moodi Banda (1986)
 Mr. Raja (1987)
 Sathyam Shivam Sundaram (1987)
 Ondagi Balu (1989)
 Sididedda Gandu (1990)
 Ramachaari (1991)
 Gopi Krishna (1992)
 Guru Brahma (1992)
 Sri Ramachandra (1992)
 Ranjitha (1993)
 Ananda Jyothi (1993)
 Adhipathi (1994)
 Jenina Hole (1997)
 Cheluva (1997)
 Kurubana Rani (1998)
 Mangalyam Tantunanena (1998)
 Shanti Shanti Shanti (1998)
 Jaidev (1998)
 Premotsava (1999)
 O Premave (1999)
 Chora Chittha Chora (1999)
 Appu (2000)
 Chamundi (2000)
 Mr. Harishchandra (2001)
 Maduve Aagona Baa (2001)
 Dhumm (2002)
 Dhruva (2002)
 Appu (2002)
 Annavru (2003)
 Sri Ram (2003)
 Abhi (2003)
 Neenandre Ishta (2003)
 Sahukara (2004)
 Pakkadmane Hudugi (2004)
 Sarvabhouma (2004)
 Mellusire Savigana (2004)
 Auto Shankar (2005)
 Sye (2005)
 Encounter Dayanayak (2005)
 Rishi (2005)
 Ajay (2006)
 Milana (2007)
 Annavru (2006)
 Abhi (2003)
 Jackie (2010)
 Myna (2013)
 Chamundi (2007)
 Sahukara (2006)
 Uppi Dada M.B.B.S. (2005)
 Dhruva (2002)
 Dhumm (2002)
 Sye (2005)
 Mussanje Maathu (2008)
 Gokula (2009)
 Chandra (2013)
 Brahma (2014)
 Endendigu (2015)
 Boxer (2015)
 Chamak (2017)
 Tarak(2017)

Telugu

 Andala Ramudu (1973)
Challani talli (1975)
 Jarujuthunna Katha (1977)
 Vaaralabbai
 Manasa Veena (1984)
 Sravana Sandhya (1986)
 Brahma Rudrulu (1986)
 Trimurtulu (1987)
 Aha Naa-Pellanta! (1987)
 Vijetha Vikram (1987)
 Geethanjali (1989)
 Rudraveena (1988)
 Bobbili Raja (1990)
(Adavilo Anna) (1997)
 Pelli Chesukundam (1997)
 Manasichi Choodu (1998)
 Samarasimha Reddy (1999)
 Bujji Gadi Babai (1998)
 Bhalevadivi Basu (2001)
 Santosham (2002)
 Jai Chiranjeeva  (2005)
 Super (2005)
 Raraju (2006)
 Poola Rangadu (2012)
 Brahma (2014)
 Power (2014)
 Prematho Mee Karthik (2017)
 Ammamma Gari Illu (2018)
 Entha Manchivaadavuraa (2020)

Television
 Micro Thodar Macro Sinthanaigal - Plastic Vizhuthugal {Tamil serial}

References

External links
 
 Sumithra at MSI

Indian film actresses
Actresses in Telugu cinema
Living people
Actresses from Thrissur
Actresses in Malayalam cinema
Actresses in Kannada cinema
Actresses in Tamil cinema
Place of birth missing (living people)
20th-century Indian actresses
21st-century Indian actresses
Actresses in Tamil television
1953 births